Farhad Momand (born 3 November 2000) is an Afghan cricketer. He made his List A debut for Nangarhar Province in the 2019 Afghanistan Provincial Challenge Cup tournament on 31 July 2019. He made his Twenty20 debut on 12 September 2020, for Band-e-Amir Dragons in the 2020 Shpageeza Cricket League.

References

External links
 

2000 births
Living people
Afghan cricketers
Band-e-Amir Dragons cricketers
Place of birth missing (living people)